Lawrence Bagnell  (born December 19, 1949) is a former Canadian politician who served as the Member of Parliament (MP) for the riding of Yukon from 2000 to 2011 and again from 2015 to 2021. He served as a member of the Liberal Party of Canada.

Early life
Bagnell was born in Toronto, Ontario.

A graduate of the University of Toronto, Bagnell holds a Bachelor of Arts and Bachelor of Science.

In 1999, Bagnell was recognized by the City of Whitehorse with the Volunteer of the Year Award for his long record of community service, including terms as President of the Yukon chapter of the United Way, President of Yukon Learn Society, and President of the Skookum Jim Friendship Centre.

Political career
Bagnell ran for a seat to the House of Commons of Canada in the 2000 Canadian federal election. He won the Yukon defeating incumbent Louise Hardy by 70 votes. He was re-elected in the 2004 federal election with close to half of the votes. Under the Paul Martin government, he served as the Parliamentary Secretary to both the Minister of Natural Resources and Minister of Indian Affairs and Northern Development.

He was again re-elected in the 2006 election, increasing both his number and percentage of votes. In February 2006, a local newspaper in Whitehorse, Yukon suggested that he be a candidate in the upcoming Liberal leadership race.

In February 2006, Bagnell was named the Critic for Northern Affairs in the Shadow Cabinet of Opposition leader Bill Graham, a role he continued to serve throughout his years in opposition.

On August 25, 2006, he announced that he was supporting Michael Ignatieff for the leadership of the Liberal Party of Canada.

Bagnell ran for a fourth term in the 2008 federal election. He won a tight four-way race defeating future Yukon Premier Darrell Pasloski and two other candidates.

Bagnell ran for his fifth term in the 2011 federal election but was defeated by Conservative candidate Ryan Leef, finishing second place out of four candidates in a closely contested election. Leef had campaigned on Bagnell voting in favour of the long gun registry, which was unpopular in the constituency.

Four years later, Bagnell sought a rematch with Leef, and defeated him decisively to regain his seat in the House of Commons.  He was thereafter named as the chair of the Standing Committee on Procedure and House Affairs.

In March 2016, Bagnell was elected as the Vice-Chair of the Standing Committee of Parliamentarians of the Arctic Region (SCPAR), an international committee of delegates from eight Arctic states (Canada, Denmark, Finland, Iceland, Norway, Russia, Sweden, the United States) and the European Parliament.

At the 2016 Maclean's magazine Parliamentarians of the Year Awards, Bagnell was recognized by his peers with the award for Best Constituency MP.

In the 2019 election, Bagnell defeated conservative challenger Jonas Smith by a margin of only 153 votes, tied for the narrowest result of any electoral district in the country with Port Moody—Coquitlam (also 153 votes).

Following the 2019 election, Bagnell was appointed as the Parliamentary Secretary to the Minister of Economic Development and Official Languages (Canadian Northern Economic Development Agency). He also served as a member of Standing Committee on National Defence. Bagnell did not run in the 2021 federal election.

Electoral history

Federal

Territorial 

|-

| NDP
| Dave Sloan
| align="right"| 486
| align="right"| 40.7%
| align="right"| -1.6%
|-

| Liberal
| Larry Bagnell
| align="right"| 383
| align="right"| 32.1%
| align="right"| +0.2%
|-

|-
! align=left colspan=3|Total
! align=right| 1195
! align=right| 100.0%
! align=right| –
|}

}
|-

| NDP
| Dave Sloan
| align="right"| 433
| align="right"| 42.3%
| align="right"| -3.3%

 
|Liberal
| Larry Bagnell
| align="right"| 326
| align="right"| 31.9%
| align="right"| +14.8%

|- bgcolor="white"
!align="left" colspan=3|Total
! align=right| 1023
! align=right| 100.0%
! align=right| –

On the resignation of Tony Penikett, 1995

References

External links
 Official site
 

1949 births
Canadian Anglicans
Liberal Party of Canada MPs
Living people
Members of the House of Commons of Canada from Yukon
Members of the King's Privy Council for Canada
Politicians from Whitehorse
Politicians from Toronto
21st-century Canadian politicians